Perry Island is an island in Prince William Sound, Alaska, within the Chugach National Forest, located immediately east of Culross Island. The island was called "Perry" by U.S. Coast and Geodetic Survey in 1900.

References

Islands of Alaska
Islands of Chugach Census Area, Alaska
Islands of Unorganized Borough, Alaska